Iron Gold is a 2018 science fiction novel by American author Pierce Brown, the first of a trilogy which continues the story of his Red Rising trilogy (2014–2016). Iron Gold takes place ten years after the events of Morning Star (2016), with Darrow "The Reaper" of Lykos and Virginia "Mustang" au Augustus leading the new Solar Republic. It is followed by Dark Age (2019).

Plot summary
Ten years after their victory over the Golds of the Core Worlds, a new Solar Republic has replaced the tyrannical Society. Darrow of Lykos serves as ArchImperator of the Republic's forces, which are still at war with the Ash Lord, Magnus au Grimmus, and his allies. Darrow's wife Virginia au Augustus governs as the elected Sovereign, but a faction called Vox Populi, led by Dancer, has risen to power in the Senate. Ignoring the Senate's orders, Darrow launches a massive assault on Mercury, wresting the planet from the Ash Lord but with great casualties. When the Senate learns from Darrow's enemy, Julia au Bellona, that he rejected an overture of peace from the Ash Lord, they issue a warrant for Darrow's arrest. Darrow, knowing that the potential truce is a ploy by the Ash Lord that will never come to fruition, escapes with his closest allies on a dangerous mission to assassinate Magnus. Darrow and the Howlers set off to Earth, where they free Apollonius au Valii-Rath and set off to Venus to kill the Ash Lord. They invade his fortress, but find him bedridden. He reveals that his daughter Atalantia is heading to retake Mercury, which is not fully protected.

Meanwhile, Cassius au Bellona and his ward Lysander au Lune become embroiled in the political upheaval happening in the Outer Rim, as Dido au Raa deposes her husband, Romulus, the Sovereign of the Rim Dominion. Cassius is challenged by multiple Golds for his past "crimes" against the Raa; he kills one after the other but is gravely wounded, and ultimately dies. Dido shows the Moon Lords evidence that their Ganymede shipyards were destroyed by Darrow and not by Roque au Fabii as they had been led to believe. They decide to go to war against the Republic, and Lysander joins them.

Lyria is a Red who lives in Camp 121 on Mars after her people are freed from the mines. The terrorist organization known as the Red Hand attacks the camp, killing nearly everyone, and Lyria and her nephew Liam are the only members of her family to survive. Republic forces eventually arrive to intervene, and Lyria saves Kavax au Telemanus from drowning. He takes her into his household. On Luna, Lyria befriends a veteran named Philippe, who is actually the criminal Ephraim ti Horn in disguise. He uses her in his plan to bring down a Telemanus transport ship and kidnap Pax, the son of Darrow and Virginia, and Electra, the daughter of Sevro and Victra, at the request of the crime lord known as the Duke of Hands. Caught after the fact, Ephraim agrees to help his former sister-in-law, Darrow's deputy Holiday ti Nakamura, retrieve the children. Ephraim flees the Duke's compound with Pax and Electra, but the Duke's boss, the Syndicate Queen, seizes control of his stolen ship.

Characters
 Darrow au Andromedus of Lykos,  the "Reaper" and the "Morning Star": a Red physically remade into a Gold to infiltrate and destroy the Society. The former leader of the revolution known as "The Rising", Darrow is the ArchImperator of the new Solar Republic.
 Virginia au Augustus, a.k.a. "Mustang" (Gold): daughter of the former ArchGovernor of Mars, Darrow's wife, and mother of their son Pax. She serves the new Solar Republic as its elected Sovereign.
 Sevro au Barca, a.k.a. "Goblin" and "Ares" (Gold): Darrow's best friend and second-in-command.
 Victra au Barca (Gold): Darrow's former lieutenant, Sevro's wife, and daughter of the Julii family.
 Cassius au Bellona (Gold): Darrow's close friend-turned-bitter enemy, known as the Morning Knight under the previous Sovereign, Octavia au Lune. Though he and Darrow have reconciled, Cassius remains an independent freedom fighter far-removed from the Republic worlds.
 Lysander au Lune (Gold): grandson and heir to Octavia au Lune. He has been raised and protected by Cassius since the rise of the Republic.
 Kavax au Telemanus (Gold): longtime ally to Virginia and Darrow, father of Daxo and the deceased Pax au Telemanus.
 Niobe au Telemanus (Gold): Kavax's wife.
 Daxo au Telemanus (Gold): son and heir to Kavax.
 Thraxa au Telemanus (Gold): daughter of Kavax and Niobe.
 Magnus au Grimmus, a.k.a. the "Ash Lord" (Gold): former ArchImperator and supreme commander of the Sovereign's fleet, he and his allies are the remaining holdouts against the new Republic.
 Atalantia au Grimmus (Gold): the Ash Lord's daughter, sister to Aja au Grimmus and Moira au Grimmus.
 Julia au Bellona (Gold): Cassius' estranged mother and Darrow's enemy, a supporter of the Ash Lord, widow of Tiberius au Bellona.
 Romulus au Raa (Gold): Sovereign of the Rim Dominion, home of a collection of Gold families who seceded from the Society in the distant past.
 Dido au Raa (Gold): Romulus' wife.
 Seraphina au Raa (Gold): daughter of Romulus and Dido.
 Diomedes au Raa, a.k.a. the "Storm Knight" (Gold): son of Romulus and Dido.
 Marius au Raa (Gold): Quaestor, and son of Romulus and Dido.
 Alexandar au Arcos (Gold), Howler and eldest grandson of Lorn au Arcos, the former Rage Knight and Darrow's mentor.
 Pax (Gold): son of Darrow and Virginia.
 Electra au Barca (Gold): eldest daughter of Sevro and Victra.
 Apollonius au Valii-Rath (Gold): imprisoned brother of Tactus.
 Regulus ag Sun, a.k.a. "Quicksilver" (Silver): the richest man in the known worlds and co-founder of the Sons of Ares. He has almost singlehandedly rebuilt Luna following the fall of the Society.
 Sefi (Obsidian): Queen of the Obsidian Valkyries, and sister to fallen hero Ragnar. She is a longtime ally of Darrow's, but now realizes the toll his war has taken on her people.
 Wulfgar the Whitetooth (Obsidian): hero of the rising, now ArchWarden of the Republic.
 Holiday ti Nakamura (Gray): Legionnaire and Darrow's deputy, formerly a mole for the Sons of Ares.
 Ephraim ti Horn (Gray): former son of Ares whose fiancé, Holiday's brother Trigg, was killed rescuing Darrow and Victra from imprisonment. Ephraim works as a freelance thief.
 Volga Fjorgan (Obsidian):  one of Ephraim's associates.
 Dano (Red): one of Ephraim's associates.
 "Dancer" (Red): Darrow's mentor in the Sons of Ares, now a powerful senator in the Republic and leader of the Vox Populi faction.
 Rhonna (Red): daughter of Darrow's brother, and one of his lancers.
 Lyria of Lagalos (Red): Gamma Red from Mars who saves the life of Kavax au Telemanus, and joins his household.
 Cyra si Lamensis (Green): locksmith and one of Ephraim's associates.
 Pytha (Blue): pilot and companion of Cassius and Lysander.
 Mickey (Violet): carver who remade Darrow.

Development and themes
Brown announced a sequel trilogy to Red Rising in February 2016. He later noted, "I didn't think I would write more but I started seeing so many plots, particularly with the Ash Lord and the chaos that happens when an empire falls." Brown said of his inspiration to write the sequel trilogy:

Brown said that while the first trilogy followed Darrow's quest, the new series explores the consequences of Darrow's rebellion, asking "Have they unleashed dark ages or a renaissance? I think you can pretty much bet it'll be dark ages for a little while." He cited the primary theme as "What is better, rule and order or chaos and freedom?", and later explained, "What this new book is about ... is seeing the people that are affected negatively by the positive actions of Darrow, and seeing the negative repercussions of them." Before publication, Brown noted that both Darrow and Mustang would be "integral characters" in the novel, which would be told from four viewpoints: Darrow, another familiar character, and two new ones. Though Brown considered several characters, including Mustang and Sevro, he wanted a more even representation of colors, and chose Darrow, the Red-turned-Gold protagonist of the first trilogy; Lysander, a Gold disenfranchised by the events of the previous novels; and two new characters with a grudge against Darrow and the Rebellion: Lyria, a Red freed from slavery in the mines, and Ephraim, a Gray whose husband was killed rescuing Darrow. Brown said, "I want to expand the universe and also see how others perceive Darrow." Besides introducing new characters, the new trilogy will explore planets and elements only briefly touched on in the previous series. Brown called the scope of the new trilogy "huge" and "far more ambitious than Red Rising", noting: "It spans the solar system, weaves in disparate cultures and moons and planets—most of which had to be created from scratch. It has been an exercise not only in world-building but in understanding how the world would affect these diverse characters." Comparing the new trilogy to the previous, Brown said, "It has the firefights and midnight duels and blood feuds, but many of the characters are not wrecking balls like Darrow. They must use other means to achieve their goals." He explained that the novel's title "refers to the original Gold conquerors; the founders of Society who were infinitely tougher, smarter, and more brutal than their descendants would become after 700 years of rule. It is an ideal that many of the former ruling class wish to bring back in their fight against the Rising."

Brown also noted, "Several of the main characters in the next one will be gay. Darrow's heteronormative outlook has been changing after leaving the mines. He began embracing sexual fluidity and gay characters like Tactus." He discussed the popularity of his novels among the LGBT community, adding "It's amazing that they have found a home in these books ... All these lost souls in my books have connected with people and I find it incredibly moving."

Publication
Iron Gold was released on January 16, 2018, and debuted at #3 on The New York Times Best Seller list. It is the first novel of a planned trilogy.

References

External links
 
 NPR review

2018 American novels
2018 science fiction novels
American adventure novels
American science fiction novels
Dystopian novels
Classical mythology in popular culture
Fiction set on Jupiter's moons
Novels set on Mars
Novels about slavery
Novels by Pierce Brown
Fiction set on Phobos (moon)
Science fantasy novels
Works about women in war
Del Rey books